On March 9, 2015, an Amtrak passenger train derailed in Halifax, North Carolina, after colliding with a truck carrying an oversize load that was obstructing the line at a grade crossing. There were no fatalities, but 55 people were injured.

Accident
At approximately 12:19 p.m., Eastern Standard Time, an Amtrak passenger train collided with a truck, which was obstructing the track on a grade crossing in Halifax, North Carolina. The train was the northbound Carolinian, from Charlotte, North Carolina to New York. There were 221 people on the train; 213 passengers and 8 crew members. Fifty-five people were injured in the accident. The locomotive and baggage car left the track when it struck the truck, which was hauling electrical equipment. GE P42DC locomotive #185 was hauling the train. The locomotive was turned on its side by the force of the accident, and one end of the baggage car was pushed into a brush-covered area next to the railroad right of way. The engineer was among those injured.

The truck, an oversize load carrying a power distribution center to New Jersey, had a combined weight of 255,000 pounds, equaling . The truck was being escorted by officers of the North Carolina State Highway Patrol. The truck driver was having trouble negotiating a turn, and spent eight minutes backing up and moving forward repeatedly in an attempt to complete the turn at the correct angle. As the Amtrak train approached, the driver realized he could not clear the track in time, and exited the vehicle. The truck driver was uninjured.

The truck's driver, 43-year-old John Devin Black of Claremont, North Carolina, had a valid commercial drivers license, which allowed him to haul the oversize load. Black had a history of 12 traffic violations prior to the accident, including excessive speed, and driving more than once using a revoked license.

At the time of the accident, the train was headed for New York City from Charlotte, North Carolina.

Aftermath 
A witness told a 9-1-1 operator that she did not hear a train horn, but that the railroad crossing lights were working at the site of the accident.

Shortly after the accident North Carolina Department of Transportation (NCDOT) reported that U.S. 301, N.C. 903 and N.C. 125 were closed in all directions for emergency response, clean-up and investigation purposes. 170 of the remaining uninjured passengers were transported by bus to Richmond, Virginia to be placed on another train.

The day after the derailment, authorities stated that no charges will be filed against Black in relation to this accident.

Investigation
The National Transportation Safety Board was dispatched to the accident scene, and are investigating. The North Carolina Department of Transportation (NCDOT) released a statement on March 9, 2015 that the department would assist Amtrak with the investigation of the accident. The FRA stated it was reviewing an on-board event recorder, interviewing the train's crew, the truck driver, and the North Carolina Patrol trooper that was escorting the truck.

Investigators are also attempting to discover if proper protocol for oversized loads was being followed before the accident, as protocol calls for troopers who are escorting the vehicles to "clear their routes and inform the railroad dispatchers what they're doing".

Litigation
In May 2015, Amtrak and CSX Transportation (who owns the line) filed a civil lawsuit against Turner Transfer Company, also known as Guy M. Turner Incorporated, who operated the oversize load. The railroad companies alleged that the trucking company, and driver John Black, caused the accident by negligently hauling the oversize load across a marked railroad crossing in an unsafe manner. Both railway companies were seeking in excess of US$75,000 each.

See also
Hixon rail crash - historic case in UK that changed working practices on British railways when an oversized load under police escort was struck by a passenger train in the 1960s.

References

2015 disasters in the United States
2015 in North Carolina
Accidents and incidents involving Amtrak
Railroad crossing accidents in the United States
Railway accidents in 2015
Rail transportation in North Carolina
Transportation in Halifax County, North Carolina
Derailments in the United States
Halifax, North Carolina